Foppolo is a comune (municipality) in the Province of Bergamo in the Italian region of Lombardy, located about  northeast of Milan and about  north of Bergamo.

Foppolo borders the following municipalities: Caiolo, Carona, Cedrasco, Fusine, Tartano, Valleve.

On January 12, 1977, an avalanche buried part of the village and killed eight people.

Winter Sports 
In the winter Foppolo becomes an important resort in the province of Bergamo, with a large amount of ski slopes. The resort is linked by piste to the resort of Carona Carisole, creating an area with 12 lifts serving 26 runs, with an area of 30 km and a height drop from 2200m to 1635m.

Demographic evolution

References